Omar Sowe (born 28 October 2000) is a Gambian professional footballer who plays as a forward for 1. deild karla club Leiknir Reykjavík.

Career

Early career
Raised in Harrison, New Jersey, Sowe attended Harrison High School and became the school's all time leading scorer in October 2018. He finished his four year high school career with 89 goals and 67 assists, as well as being named to the NJSCAA All-State team in 2017 and 2018.

Sowe began playing with the New York Red Bulls academy in 2018. He also appeared for the club's USL League Two side New York Red Bulls U-23.

New York Red Bulls II
Sowe signed his first professional contract with the New York Red Bulls II on 16 August 2019. He made his professional debut on August 24, 2019, appearing as a 66th-minute substitute during a 5-1 victory over Swope Park Rangers. On September 21, 2019, Sowe scored his first goal as a professional in a 5-3 loss against Louisville City FC. On 9 September 2020, Sowe recorded scored three goals in a 6-0 victory over 	Philadelphia Union II. Sowe finished the 2020 season leading Red Bulls II in goals with 7.

On 18 May 2021, Sowe scored his first goal of the season in a 2-1 victory over Loudoun United.

New York Red Bulls
On 11 September 2021, Sowe made the move to the New York Red Bulls MLS roster. He made his debut the same day, appearing as a 70th-minute substitute during a 1–1 draw with D.C. United.

Following the 2022 season, his contract option was declined by New York.

Breiðablik (loan)
On March 24, 2022, New York announced that they had loaned Sowe to Breiðablik of the Icelandic Besta-deild karla. Sowe scored his first goal for the club on May 7, 2022, during a 5-1 victory over ÍA.

Leiknir Reykjavík
On December 29, 2022, Sowe signed with Icelandic second division club Leiknir Reykjavík.

Career statistics

References

2000 births
Living people
Gambian footballers
American soccer players
Major League Soccer players
New York Red Bulls U-23 players
New York Red Bulls II players
New York Red Bulls players
Breiðablik UBK players
Leiknir Reykjavík players
People from Harrison, New Jersey
Soccer players from New Jersey
USL League Two players
USL Championship players
Association football forwards
Expatriate footballers in Iceland
American expatriate sportspeople in Iceland